Carla Casals Solé (born 6 February 1987) is a Paralympic swimmer from Spain.

Personal 
Casals is from the Catalan region of Spain. Living at the High Performance Centre (CAR) of San Cugat del Vallés in 2013, she shared a room with an Olympic athlete.

Swimming 
Casals is an S12 classified swimmer.  She is affiliated with the Spanish Federation of Sports for the Blind (FEDC).

In 2007, Casals competed at the IDM German Open.  Casals won a gold medal at the 2009 IPC European Swimming Championships. She was one of 42 Spanish team members, of which 22 had physical disabilities, 6 had cerebral palsy, 10 were blind and four had intellectual disabilities. Casals competed at the 2010 Adapted Swimming World Championship in the Netherlands, where she won a gold medal.  She finished seventh in the 100 meter backstroke.

In 2011, Casals trained with Deborah Font Jimenez. She competed at the 2011 IPC European Swimming Championships in Berlin, Germany, finishing fifth in the 200 meter freestyle and fourth in the 100 meter breaststroke. In 2012, Casals competed at the  Paralympic Swimming Championship of Spain by Autonomous Communities.  She finished first in the 100 meter butterfly event and second in the SB23 100 meter breaststroke event. She competed at the 2012 Summer Paralympics, where she finished eighth in the 200 meter individual medley, fourth in the 100 meter butterfly, and sixth in the 100 meter breastroke. Prior to heading to London, she participated in a national vision impaired swim team training camp at the High Performance Centre of Sant Cugat from 6 to 23 August.  Daily at the camp, there were two in water training sessions and one out of water training session. Casals competed at the 2013 Swimming Championship of Catalonia, hosted by the Sabadell Swimming Club, where she was one of nine Spanish swimmers to set a qualifying time for the World Championships. She competed at the 2013 IPC Swimming World Championships.  From the Catalan region of Spain, she was a recipient a 2012 Plan ADO scholarship.

Notes

References

External links 
 

1987 births
Living people
Spanish female backstroke swimmers
Spanish female breaststroke swimmers
Spanish female butterfly swimmers
Spanish female freestyle swimmers
Spanish female medley swimmers
Paralympic swimmers of Spain
Paralympic swimmers with a vision impairment
Swimmers at the 2004 Summer Paralympics
Swimmers at the 2008 Summer Paralympics
Swimmers at the 2012 Summer Paralympics
Swimmers from Barcelona
Plan ADOP alumni
Medalists at the World Para Swimming Championships
Medalists at the World Para Swimming European Championships
S12-classified Paralympic swimmers
21st-century Spanish women
Spanish blind people